Willow Hill may refer to:

 Willow Hill, Music Artist, United Kingdom
 Willow Hill, Illinois, United States
 Willow Hill Township, Jasper County, Illinois
 Willow Hill, Pennsylvania
 Willow Hill Covered Bridge, covered bridge located off U.S. Route 30 that spans Miller’s Run in Lancaster County, Pennsylvania